This is a list of Ice Road Truckers Season 2 episodes.

Season 2 premiered on June 8, 2008, following the drivers on the Tuktoyaktuk Winter Road, a  extension of the Dempster Highway between Inuvik and Tuktoyaktuk in Canada's Northwest Territories. As the ice road from Inuvik to Tuktoyaktuk is completed, drivers converge on Inuvik for the start of the year's transport season. Debogorski, Rowland, Yemm, and Sherwood find themselves lumped in with the other "highway maggots" – the local drivers' term for rookies on this road – and must adapt to new rules and conditions. The road takes them up the Mackenzie River and over parts of the Arctic Ocean, visiting Aput and Later Langley rigs with long stretches in which drivers are out of radio contact. The final regular episode premiered on September 7, 2008.

Drivers 

Debogorski, Rowland, Sherwood, and Yemm take part in this season as "highway maggots"—rookies on the ice road from Inuvik to Tuktoyaktuk. The following experienced truckers are also profiled.

Eric Dufresne: A 46-year-old native of Montreal, now a resident of Faro, Yukon, with 26 years of experience on this ice road. As a result, he is often entrusted with loads that are heavy or hard to handle, such as a derrick in the season premiere.
Bear Swensen: Born in Saskatchewan, Swensen is a 59-year-old resident of British Columbia and a six-year ice road veteran. He has worked most of his life as a truck driver in the logging industry, with some actual logging experience as well. When not working on the ice roads, he works as a professional bear hunting guide. Like Dufresne, he frequently pulls heavier-than-average loads.

Support personnel 

Jordan Fedosoff: The manager of Matco's Inuvik branch office, Fedosoff was born in Saskatchewan and raised between the fields of Saskatchewan and the city of Montreal. He began working in the trucking industry in 1981. He has driven and worked in Inuvik since 1995. He has vast experience in the Mackenzie Valley and the Dempster Highway. Sherwood worked for him in season 2.
Doug Saunders: Saunders is the operations manager for E. Gruben's Transport, the company that hires Debogorski and Yemm. He considers Yemm to be one of his more "high-maintenance" drivers, in terms of Yemm's rough handling of the trucks and frequent complaints about the work environment.
Shaun Lundrigan: The chief mechanic at the Gruben's freight yard in Tuktoyaktuk, he finds himself repairing Yemm's trucks several times during the season. As a result, his opinion of Yemm as a trucker steadily deteriorates from week to week.
Jerry Dusdal: The "truck push" for Mullen Transportation, he takes responsibility for the truckers' safety and delivery of their loads. He states in the season premiere that he will never send someone else to do a job that he is not willing to do himself. When an entire drilling operation must be moved from one site to another, he deals with the logistics and equipment dismantling, as well as the delay caused by a winter storm that strikes the area.
Davey Lennie: A foreman on the Northwind ice road construction crew, he looks after the trucks when the road is closed, and also stands ready to respond to any distress calls that come in. In the season premiere, he describes an incident from the previous year in which his truck broke through the ice. Oversized loads, such as a survival shack hauled by Dufresne, sometimes require his help to get from the edge of town to the freight yard. His cousin Isaac drives with Rowland to get some road experience before taking the written exam for his truck driver's license.
Kelly Brown: A veteran driver in Inuvik, Kelly works for Matco Transportation, the second company that hires Sherwood shortly after the season begins. He rides with Sherwood on a training run to help him get used to driving the Arctic ice roads. Brown grew up in Montreal and began driving trucks in 1983; he has worked the ice roads since 1993.
Devon Neff: A rookie driver on the ice roads who works for Mullen, Neff is called in to help move equipment off the Langley site late in the season. Due to the poor condition of the road at this time, he must contend with hazards such as breaks in the surface and water overflows from beneath the ice.

Route and destinations 

Tuktoyaktuk Winter Road
 Inuvik, Northwest Territories: Loads are assigned here to be transported north.
 Mallik: An exploration site that encompasses fields of natural gas hydrates. By the end of the season, the crews working here succeed in extracting gas from these formations.
 Aput: A natural gas exploration site set up by MGM Energy; later found to contain no significant deposits, whereupon the entire camp is moved 50 miles to Langley (see below).
 Langley: MGM's second and last exploration site of the year; proves to hold sizable deposits.
 Aklavik, Northwest Territories: A small hamlet, on the Mackenzie River delta, that depends on the ice road for delivery of needed supplies.
 Tuktoyaktuk, Northwest Territories: Loads (e.g. backhauls) are assigned here to be transported south.
  Wurmlinger and Arctic Star : Two ice-locked barges that serve as headquarters for crews in the field. In the summer the Wurmlinger carries goods around.

Final load counts 
 Sherwood — 9; spent most of the season driving on pavement in Inuvik
 Debogorski — 22 as stated in "A Trucker's Farewell"; left early for medical reasons
 Yemm — 51; fired on the last day of the season
 Swensen — 63; hauled a total of 4 million pounds, probably the most of any driver this season
 Dufresne — 67
 Rowland — 68

Episodes

Special

A special titled "Off the Ice" premiered on September 21, 2008. This episode provides a look back at the events of the season, with additional commentary from the truckers and support personnel. Topics covered include:

 Development of Canada's ice roads in general, and of commerce along the Tuktoyaktuk Winter Road in particular
 Building the road and outfitting trucks to drive along it
 The truckers' personal motivations for working in the Arctic and comparisons between there and Yellowknife
 Each group's opinions about the other (northern and southern drivers)
 Truckers' comments about key events of the season: Sherwood quitting after one day, Debogorski leaving due to health problems, Yemm's personnel disagreements and firing, Rowland hauling sewage for most of his runs.

References 

 
2008 American television seasons
Ice Road Truckers seasons